Kenneth Howell, Jr. (November 28, 1960 – November 9, 2018) was an American professional baseball pitcher and pitching coach, who played in Major League Baseball (MLB) for the National League (NL) Los Angeles Dodgers and Philadelphia Phillies (-). He batted and threw right-handed.

Scholastically, Howell attended Northwestern High School (Michigan), in Detroit, Michigan. He continued his education at the Tuskegee Institute, graduating in 1982. In 1981, he played collegiate summer baseball with the Cotuit Kettleers of the Cape Cod Baseball League. Howell was selected by the Dodgers in the 3rd round, 73rd pick overall, of the 1982 Major League Baseball draft, after being scouted by Tony John. He made his MLB debut on June 25, 1984, at Dodger Stadium. Howell pitched a scoreless 9th inning, allowing 2 singles, in a 9–4 loss to the San Diego Padres.

That October 12, on the road at Busch Stadium II, pitching in (NLCS) Game 3. Howell's stat line for the day included, 2 innings pitched (IP), 0 runs (R}, and 2 strikeouts.(SO), in the eighth inning.

Howell's final big league appearance came on August 5, 1990, at Veterans Stadium. While he left the game after 4 innings, trailing the Pittsburgh Pirates 5–2, the Von Hayes- and John Kruk-led Phillies rallied to beat the Buccos, 8–6. Following his playing career, Howell served as both a minor- and major-league coach for the Dodgers.

Howell suffered from diabetes, complications of which resulted in the amputation of one of his toes in 2008. He died on November 9, 2018, in West Bloomfield, Michigan. He was 57 years old.

Playing career
Howell was drafted by the Los Angeles Dodgers in the 3rd round of the 1982 MLB Draft out of Tuskegee University. He made his Major League debut for the Dodgers on June 25, 1984, against the San Diego Padres, working a scoreless ninth inning. His first start was on July 3, 1984, against the Pittsburgh Pirates, allowing three earned runs in 5.2 innings to take the loss. His first career win came in an extra innings game against the St. Louis Cardinals on July 6, 1984. He was 5–5 with a 3.33 ERA for the Dodgers that season, including 6 saves (the first of which occurred on August 3 against the Cincinnati Reds). He remained with the Dodgers through the 1988 season, acquiring an 18–29 record and 4.04 ERA in 194 games, with 4 starts and 31 saves.

Howell was involved in a pair of trades involving the Baltimore Orioles during a five-day span in early-December 1988. He was acquired along with Brian Holton and Juan Bell from the Dodgers for Eddie Murray on the 4th, then sent with Gordon Dillard to the Philadelphia Phillies for Phil Bradley on the 9th. The second transaction addressed the Phillies' need for starting pitching and the Orioles' for right-handed hitting. He pitched in 33 games with the Phillies in 1989, 32 of which were starts and was 12–12 with a 3.44 ERA and then made 18 starts in 1990 with an 8–7 record and 4.64 ERA. Injury issues caused him to miss the rest of the 1990 season and most of 1991 and 1992, appearing in only 6 games in AAA in 1991 and none at all in 1992.

Howell attempted a comeback with the Texas Rangers in 1993, but after 6 appearances (4 starts) for the Gulf Coast Rangers he was released. He then played in 1994 for the unaffiliated San Bernardino Spirit before retiring.

Coaching career
He returned to the Dodgers in 2003 as the pitching coach for the Vero Beach Dodgers in Class-A and was subsequently promoted to pitching coach for the AA Jacksonville Suns in 2005 and AAA Las Vegas 51s from 2006 to 2007.

In 2008, Howell joined the Dodgers Major League coaching staff as the bullpen coach, a position he held through 2012 under Managers Joe Torre and Don Mattingly. On November 13, 2012, he became the Assistant Pitching Coach for the Dodgers and remained in that position through the 2015 season.

Personal life
Howell was rushed to the hospital on February 6, 2015, when it was found he was suffering from kidney failure. It was later discovered he was suffering from pancreatic necrosis, an anaerobic infection, as well as other health complications. Howell underwent multiple surgeries, and later texted to the media that he was "doing much better."

Howell died on November 9, 2018.

References

External links

Ken Howell at Baseball Almanac

   

Los Angeles Dodgers players
Philadelphia Phillies players
Major League Baseball pitchers
Baseball players from Detroit
1960 births
2018 deaths
Northwestern High School (Michigan) alumni
African-American baseball coaches
African-American baseball players
Los Angeles Dodgers coaches
Major League Baseball bullpen coaches
Tuskegee Golden Tigers baseball players
Vero Beach Dodgers players
San Antonio Dodgers players
Albuquerque Dukes players
Bakersfield Dodgers players
Scranton/Wilkes-Barre Red Barons players
Gulf Coast Rangers players
San Bernardino Spirit players
Cotuit Kettleers players
20th-century African-American sportspeople
21st-century African-American people